Quebec County was a historic county in the province of Quebec, Canada. The county included the Quebec City metropolitan area and extended northwestward. The county seat was Loretteville.

Quebec County was used as an electoral district in the first election held for members of the Legislative Assembly of Lower Canada in 1792.

Creation (1855)

The County was established on July 1, 1855, encompassing all municipalities and unorganized territory within the following limits:

 to the south: the Saint Lawrence River
 to the north: the 48th parallel
 to the west: the western limits of the parishes of Sainte-Foy, l'Ancienne-Lorette and Saint-Ambroise, and of the Seigniory of Saint-Gabriel and the prolongation thereof to the northern limit of the County
 to the east: the southwestern line of the Seigniory of La Côte de Beaupré until it meets the southeastern line of the Township of Tewkesbury, then northeast to its eastern corner, then by its northeastern line to the rear thereof, and then by the prolongation of that line to the northern limit of the county
 excepting the City of Quebec and the parishes of Notre-Dame-de-Quebec and Saint-Roch-de-Québec.

In 1896, in addition to the unorganized territory, the County comprised the following entities:

 the parishes of Beauport, Charlesbourg, L'Ancienne-Lorette, Saint-Ambroise-de-la-Jeune-Lorette, Saint-Colomb-de-Sillery, Saint-Félix-du-Cap-Rouge and Sainte-Foy
 the municipalities of Limoilou, Saint-Dunstan-du-lac-Beauport, Saint-Gabriel-de-Valcartier, Saint-Gabriel-Ouest and St-Malo
 in the banlieue of the City of Quebec: the parishes of Quebec, Notre-Dame-des-Anges, Sacré-Cœur-de-Jésus, Saint-Roch-Nord and Saint-Sauveur-de-Québec
 the united townships of Stoneham-et-Tewkesbury
 the fief Hubert

In 1864, Saint-Colomb-de-Sillery was granted the powers of a county council for certain limited purposes.

Municipalities
The county included the following municipalities/townships:

Beauport-Ouest
Charlesbourg-Est
Charlesbourg-Ouest
Lac-Édouard
Lac-Saint-Charles
L'Ancienne-Lorette
Notre-Dame-des-Laurentides
Orsainville
Saint-Ambroise-de-la-Jeune-Lorette
Saint-Dunstan-du-Lac-Beauport
Saint-Félix-du-Cap-Rouge
Saint-Gabriel-de-Valcartier
Saint-Gabriel-Ouest
Saint-Gérard-Magella
Sainte-Monique-des-Saules
Sainte-Thérèse-de-Lisieux
Stoneham-et-Tewkesbury

Municipal reorganization (1970-1981)
The municipalities constituting the suburban area surrounding Quebec City were withdrawn from the County at the beginning of 1970 to form the Communauté urbaine de Québec.

When Quebec's county boundaries were redrawn into Regional County Municipalities the county was dissolved mostly into La Jacques-Cartier, with small parts going to Le Haut-Saint-Maurice and Portneuf.

See also
 Provincial and territorial capitals of Canada

Further reading

Notes

References

Former counties of Quebec